Weir Quay is a place on the banks of the River Tamar in Devon, England.

Weir Quay is where the Tamar estuary narrows into the tidal river.  The Tamar was navigable by seagoing ships of up to 400 register tons as far inland as here.

References

Villages in Devon
River Tamar
Bere Ferrers